Dick Locke (born February 6, 1947) was an American politician in the state of Florida.

Locke was born in Tampa and attended Central Florida. He served in the Florida House of Representatives for the 26th district from 1982 to 1990, as a Democrat.

References

1947 births
Democratic Party members of the Florida House of Representatives
People from Tampa, Florida
People from Inverness, Florida
Living people